Mumilaaq Qaqqaq first elected in 2019 as New Democratic Party member for Nunavut.
 Anne Minh-Thu Quach b. 1982 first elected in 2011 as New Democratic Party member for Salaberry—Suroît, Quebec. 
 Carla Qualtrough b. 1971 first elected in 2015 as Liberal member for Delta, British Columbia. 
 Victor Quelch b. 1891   first elected in 1935 as Social Credit member for Acadia, Alberta.
 Felix Patrick Quinn b. 1874 first elected in 1925 as Conservative member for Halifax, Nova Scotia.
 Michael Joseph Francis Quinn b. 1851 first elected in 1896 as Conservative member for St. Anne, Quebec.

Q